In Greek mythology, Helmetheus was the son of Zeus and Pyrrha, daughter of Epimetheus and Pandora, or of Prometheus. In some accounts, the son of the god and Pyrrha was Hellen instead.

Notes

References 

 Apollodorus, The Library with an English Translation by Sir James George Frazer, F.B.A., F.R.S. in 2 Volumes, Cambridge, MA, Harvard University Press; London, William Heinemann Ltd. 1921. ISBN 0-674-99135-4. Online version at the Perseus Digital Library. Greek text available from the same website.
 Pseudo-Clement, Recognitions from Ante-Nicene Library Volume 8, translated by Smith, Rev. Thomas. T. & T. Clark, Edinburgh. 1867. Online version at theoi.com

Children of Zeus
Demigods in classical mythology
Thessalian characters in Greek mythology
Thessalian mythology